The Simud Valles are an ancient outflow channel system in the Oxia Palus quadrangle of Mars, located at 19.8° N and 37.8° W. They are 945 km long and were named for the word for "Mars" in Sumerian. Note: Descriptor term changed to the plural (valles), and coordinates redefined 3/31/2008.

See also

 Geology of Mars
 HiRISE
 Outflow channels

References

Further reading

Valleys and canyons on Mars
Oxia Palus quadrangle